Father's Wild Game is a 1950 American comedy film directed by Herbert I. Leeds and written by D.D. Beauchamp. The film stars Raymond Walburn, Walter Catlett, Gary Gray, Jane Darwell, Barbara Brown and M'liss McClure. The film was released on December 3, 1950, by Monogram Pictures.

Plot

Cast           
Raymond Walburn as Henry Latham
Walter Catlett as Mayor George Colton
Gary Gray as David Latham
Jane Darwell as Minverva Bobbin
Barbara Brown as Mrs. Edna Latham
M'liss McClure as Barbara Latham
Fred Libby as Cass McCreary
Georgie Nokes as Georgie Colton
Roscoe Ates as Rancher
Ralph Sanford as Policeman
Emmett Vogan as Postmaster
Maxine Semon as Mayor's Secretary
Doris Kemper as Mrs. McCreary
Ann Tyrrell as Tilda

References

External links
 

1950 films
American comedy films
1950 comedy films
Monogram Pictures films
Films directed by Herbert I. Leeds
American black-and-white films
1950s English-language films
1950s American films